UniverCity is a sustainable community located on top of Burnaby Mountain, adjacent to Simon Fraser University. It is modeled as a sustainable community. UniverCity has won several awards for sustainable planning and development. It is currently home to over 4000 residents.

History
The groundwork for UniverCity was laid in 1963, when Arthur Erickson and Geoff Massey submitted their initial plan for Simon Fraser University. Complementing their vision for the mountain-top campus, their plan saw the new university anchoring a dense residential community. It took another 30 years before the implementation of this initial plan would begin with Simon Fraser University agreeing to transfer more than 320 hectares of university-owned land to the City of Burnaby to more than double the size of the Burnaby Mountain Conservation Area. In return, the city approved an Official Community Plan (OCP) in 1996, allowing SFU to begin development of a residential community, later named UniverCity.

The OCP had a goal of creating a compact community surrounding the campus to ensure residential expansion that was accessible. The makeup of the neighbourhoods is two districts; with one being to the south and the other to the east of campus. The OCP original concept included provisions for community facilitates such as a school, commercial core, prominent pedestrian paths and biking trails all along campus. In its completion, UniverCity is hoping to accommodate up to 10,000 residents.

SFU itself had varying visions regarding the development of such a residential community. It identified two specific aims of constructing UniverCity; to establish a more inclusive community on the mountain with varying options of housing and amenities, as well as to create an Endowment Fund to assist in further teaching and research for the campus. However while the land is fully under SFU ownership, there are serviced and subdivided parcels that are available to builders upon request and a 99-year lease agreement.

Present
In 2003, Simon Fraser University commenced construction on a new residential and commercial area occupying approximately  adjacent to the campus, atop Burnaby Mountain, called UniverCity. The area will contain up to 10,000 residential units in a number of neighbourhoods, along with a new town centre, schools, parks and other amenities. As of March 2015, approximately 4000 people lived in UniverCity. A new elementary school was scheduled to be opened in the fall of 2010 to accommodate families in the area, along with new child-care facilities. A number of new developments have taken place, including the construction of a new supermarket and several residential complexes.

UniverCity also prides itself on a sustainability campaign that has support from the Province of British Columbia and the SFU Community Trust. They have partnered with Corix Utilities to develop new and improved sustainable energy systems that aim to provide eco-friendly heat and local hot water for developing housing projects within the community. Projections estimate that this will decrease greenhouse gas emission by over 80 percent with utilities all over the campus and mountain. The project is still in early stages of construction as roughly only four completed buildings have it as of 2015, but all future buildings will incorporate environmental policies and systems.

Gordon Harris, FCIP is the President and CEO of SFU Community Trust, the organization that oversees development of UniverCity.

Awards
 Urban Land Institute's (ULI) Awards for Excellence: The Americas
 2008 Best Practices in Affordable Housing award, Canada Mortgage and Housing Corporation (CMHC)
 2008 LivCom Award
 APA 2008 National Planning Excellence Award

References

External links
UniverCity 
UniverCity Plan
UniverCity Community Association

Neighbourhoods in Burnaby
New Urbanism communities